Route 175 is a relatively short highway in Newton County running from Interstate 49/U.S. Route 71 at Tipton Ford to the city of Neosho at Business I-49 and Route 86.  It is a former alignment of US 71 and the endpoints of Neosho and unincorporated Tipton Ford are the only cities on the route.

Route description
Route 175 begins at an intersection with I-49 Bus./Route 86 northwest of Neosho, heading north on two-lane undivided Gateway Drive. The road passes through areas of fields and woods with some homes. The route continues through rural areas, making a curve to the northwest and coming to an interchange with I-49/US 71 in Tipton Ford. Past this interchange, the road continues northwest as I-49 Bus. toward Joplin.

Major intersections

References

175
U.S. Route 71
Transportation in Newton County, Missouri